Jockey Plaza is a shopping center located between the University of Lima and the Hipódromo de Monterrico, in the district of Santiago de Surco, Lima, Perú.

Shopping center 
A big hall (in Spanish nave central) with two levels exists between the main stores, which contains minor stores such as Movistar, Tommy Hilfiger, La Curacao, and Bath & Body Works. There are also games, cinemas by Cinemark, and a food court.

Main stores 

 Plaza Vea
 Tottus
 Sodimac
 Ripley
 Falabella
 Cinemark
 Divercity

References

External links 
 

Shopping malls in Peru
Buildings and structures in Lima
Tourist attractions in Lima
Economy of Lima